The Benson class was a class of destroyers of the U.S. Navy built 1939–1943. The thirty 1,620-ton Benson-class destroyers were built in two groups. The first six were authorized in fiscal year 1938 (FY38) and laid down at Bethlehem Steel, Quincy, Massachusetts, and three naval shipyards. The remaining 24 "repeat Bensons" were authorized in 1940–42 and built at four Bethlehem Steel yards. They were laid down after the first group was commissioned. These plus the "repeat Livermores" (also known as "repeat Gleaveses") were also known at the time as the Bristol class. During World War II the Bensons were usually combined with the Livermores (more correctly the Gleaves class) as the Benson-Livermore class; this persisted in references until at least the 1960s. In some references both classes are combined and called the Benson class. The Benson- and Gleaves-class destroyers were the backbone of the pre-war Neutrality Patrols and brought the action to the enemy by participating in every major campaign of the war.

Namesake
The lead ship of the class was named after William Shepherd Benson, a graduate of the Naval Academy in 1877. Benson was appointed first Chief of Naval Operations in 1915 and then served as CNO until he retired 25 September 1919. He died in Washington, D.C., 20 May 1932.

Related classes
The Bensons were originally envisioned as a single class of 24 ships, the first eight of which were ordered in fiscal year 1938 (FY38). Six of these were designed by Bethlehem Shipbuilding, to be built at Bethlehem's Fore River and at several government yards (as mandated by Congress), and two were designed by Gibbs & Cox, to be built at Bath Iron Works. After contract award, Bethlehem requested that their design be modified to use less-complex single-reduction gears and no cruising turbines. Bethlehem claimed they could achieve comparable fuel efficiency with the simpler machinery. So the class was known through World War II as the Benson-Livermore class, and this name persisted in many references until at least the 1960s. In the spring of 1938 the Navy's Bureau of Steam Engineering requested that the FY39 and FY40 ships be modified for  superheat. It proved possible for Bath to build their two FY38 ships, Gleaves and Niblack, to the new design. Gleaves was completed prior to Livermore and had a lower hull number, thus the class name is more correctly the Benson-Gleaves class.

The only external difference between the Benson and Gleaves classes was the shape of the stacks; the Bensons' were flat-sided and the Gleaveses' were round.

After the Fall of France in 1940, and before the outcome of the looming Battle of Britain was certain, a rapid expansion of the Navy was envisioned. As not all facilities were equipped to produce the new s or because of other concerns, an additional 72 "repeat" Benson- and Gleaves-class ships were ordered in FY41. 24 repeat Bensons were built by several Bethlehem yards, while an additional 48 repeat Gleaveses were built by various other builders. These were initially called the Bristol class after , a repeat Gleaves and the first of these to be completed, although the machinery of the repeat Bensons was different from the repeat Gleaveses. The repeat ships were ordered with reduced torpedo and gun armament and increased anti-submarine and light anti-aircraft armament.

In some references the Benson and Gleaves classes are combined as the Benson class.

The Budget for the United States Government (as published) for fiscal year 41, starting on 1 July 1940 called for 8 destroyers to be built,  and they were originally contemplated to be DD-445 ... DD-452, i.e. Fletchers. In June 1940, 8 Gleaves were ordered instead.

Design
Loss of one compartment, or even two adjacent compartments, would no longer disable the entire propulsion system. They also introduced quintuple torpedo tube mounts. Their scantlings, or framing dimensions, were increased to carry the weight of the new machinery. This increased the ships' displacement by about sixty tons, to 1620 tons standard displacement.

Engineering
The main steam turbines were designed and built by Bethlehem Steel.

Armament
The class was completed with four or five  dual purpose guns (anti-surface and anti-aircraft (AA)), controlled by a Mark 37 Gun Fire Control System as in the previous Sims class. The introduction of two centerline quintuple torpedo tube mounts in this class was a significant improvement and was continued in subsequent World War II classes. This allowed a broadside of ten tubes with savings in space and weight compared to previous classes, which had twelve or sixteen tubes and an eight-tube broadside. However, most of the Bensons spent most of the war with only five torpedo tubes equipped in favor of greater light anti-aircraft armament. This varied considerably in different ships as the war went on; for example, the specified pair of twin  guns were not widely available until mid-1942 and a quadruple  machine cannon mount and a  gun were temporarily substituted. In 1945 twelve ships (DD-600-601, 603–604, 608, 610, and DD-612-617) were modified for maximum light AA armament as an anti-kamikaze measure, with four 5-inch guns, no torpedo tubes, twelve 40 mm guns in two quad and two twin mounts and four 20 mm guns in two twin mounts. The first six ships landed a torpedo tube mount early in the war while on Atlantic service, but as they were transferred to the Pacific in early 1945 they were re-equipped with the torpedoes at the cost of a 5-inch gun. Photographs indicate that, as with most pre-1942 destroyers, the initial anti-submarine armament of two depth charge tracks was augmented with four or six K-gun depth charge throwers in 1941–42 on most ships.

Service
The first six ships of the class began their careers on Neutrality Patrols, and after the attack on Pearl Harbor and the US entry into World War II continued to serve in the Atlantic and Mediterranean, supporting operations in North Africa, Italy, and southern France until transferred to the Pacific in early 1945. Several of the remaining ships spent the entire war in the Atlantic and Mediterranean. Others served entirely in the Pacific, at first in the Solomon Islands or Aleutians and later in other campaigns. Three were lost in the war; two in the Pacific and one in the Mediterranean. A fourth lost the bow section but was rebuilt and returned to service. After the war the survivors were decommissioned and placed in the Reserve Fleet in 1946–47; one was transferred to Italy and two were transferred to Taiwan in the 1950s. Modernization was considered in the 1950s but not implemented except on the transferred ships. The remainder were scrapped or otherwise disposed of in the late 60s and early 70s.

Losses
USS Laffey and USS Barton were lost at the Naval Battle of Guadalcanal on 13 November 1942; USS Lansdale was lost to air attack in the Mediterranean Sea on 20 April 1944. Additionally, the bow section of USS Murphy was cut off in a collision with the tanker SS Bulkoil   from New York on 21 October 1943 and sank with the loss of 38 crew. The rest of the ship was saved and was rebuilt and returned to service; thus Murphy was not officially considered lost.

Decorations
USS Laffey received a Presidential Unit Citation for her role in the Battle of Guadalcanal. USS Bailey received a Navy Unit Commendation for her service in the Battle of the Komandorski Islands, 26 March 1943. Also, USS Hilary P. Jones received a Navy Unit Commendation for her actions in the final operations in the Mediterranean Sea in September 1944.

Ships in class

Other Navies

Republic of China (Taiwan)

Italy

See also
 Livermore class destroyer
 List of destroyers of the United States Navy
 List of destroyer classes of the United States Navy
List of ship classes of World War II

References

 Destroyerhistory.org: Benson/Gleaves ship list

External links

 Benson- and Gleaves-class destroyers at Destroyer History Foundation
 Benson-class destroyers at Destroyer History Foundation
 Tin Can Sailors @ Destroyers.org – Benson class destroyer
 USS Benson (DD-421) and USS Mayo (DD-422) General Information Book with as-built data at Destroyer History Foundation
 NavSource Destroyer Photo Index Page

 
Destroyer classes